Rebecca Lee may refer to:

 Rebecca Lee (explorer) (born 1944), explorer from Hong Kong
 Rebecca Lee (writer) (born 1967), American novelist and professor
 Rebecca Lee Crumpler (1831–1895), African-American physician
 Beki Smith (Rebecca Smith née Lee, born 1986), Australian race walker